Changes is a country album by Billy "Crash" Craddock. It was released by Capitol Records in 1980.

Track listing
"I Just Had You on My Mind"
"She's Good to Me"
"I'm Missing You"
"Now That the Feeling's Gone"
"For the Love of Yesterday"
"She's Got Legs"
"Sea Cruise"
"Ain't No Easy Way to Lose"
"Hold Me Tight"
"You Just Want to Be Mine"

Chart performance

Billy "Crash" Craddock albums
1980 albums